The Metropolitan Interscholastic Conference or MIC is a secondary or more commonly used, high school athletic conference based in the Indianapolis Metropolitan area of Indiana.  The conference was formed in 1996 in a time when independent schools joined schools with other existing conferences that were reorganizing or splitting up to form new conferences due to the initiation of class basketball.  In recent years, the MIC has been recognized nationally as a superior secondary athletic conference to participate in athletics. The MIC also competes in other areas besides athletics.  For example, there is a MIC choir competition and a MIC speech and debate tournament, as well as MIC Academic Challenge.

On December 13, 2021, the Metropolitan Interscholastic Conference voted Carmel and Center Grove out of the MIC as the two schools had flirted with a move to the Hoosier Crossroads Conference.

Member Schools
Current Members

Former Members

Membership timeline 

 

 Played only football in CI 2013-14, full members in 2014-15.
 Carmel and Center Grove were voted out of the MIC on December 13, 2021, by the other six member schools.
Carmel and Center Grove submitted an application to the Hoosier Crossroads Conference but was denied membership by the eight HCC schools.

Conference Championships

Football

Boys Basketball

Girls Basketball

Boys Cross Country

References

External links
 MIC Records Book
 Ben Davis Athletics Website
 North Central Athletics Website
 Lawrence North Athletics Website
 Lawrence Central Athletics Website
 Pike Athletics Website
 Warren Central Athletics Website

Indiana high school athletic conferences
Education in Hamilton County, Indiana
Education in Johnson County, Indiana
Education in Marion County, Indiana
Education in Vigo County, Indiana
Sports competitions in Indianapolis
Terre Haute, Indiana